The 2005–06 Talk 'N Text Phone Pals season was the 16th season of the franchise in the Philippine Basketball Association (PBA).

Key dates
August 14: The 2005 PBA Draft took place in Sta. Lucia East Grand Mall, Cainta, Rizal.

Draft picks

Roster

Fiesta Conference

Game log

|- bgcolor="#bbffbb" 
| 1
| October 7
| San Miguel
| 74–66
| Cantrell (18)
| 
| 
| Ynares Center
| 1–0
|- bgcolor="#bbffbb" 
| 2
| October 12
| Air21
| 109–91
| Cantrell (25)
| 
| 
| Ynares Center
| 2–0
|- bgcolor="#bbffbb" 
| 3
| October 19
| Sta. Lucia
| 87–80
| 
| 
| 
| Araneta Coliseum
| 3–0
|- bgcolor="#bbffbb" 
| 4
| October 21
| San Miguel
| 82–81
| Alapag (23)
| 
| 
| Araneta Coliseum
| 4–0
|- bgcolor="#edbebf" 
| 5
| October 26
| Brgy.Ginebra
| 94–100
| 
| 
| 
| Araneta Coliseum
| 4–1
|- bgcolor="#bbffbb"
| 6
| October 30
| Purefoods
| 96–82
| Cantrell, Pablo (17)
| 
| 
| Araneta Coliseum
| 5–1

|- bgcolor="#edbebf" 
| 7
| November 4
| Air21
| 88–90
| Cantrell (26)
| 
| 
| Ynares Center
| 5–2
|- bgcolor="#bbffbb" 
| 8
| November 6
| Alaska
| 101–79
| Cantrell (19)
| 
| 
| Araneta Coliseum
| 6–2
|- bgcolor="#edbebf" 
| 9
| November 12
| Sta.Lucia
| 97–100
| Cantrell, 2 others (20)
| 
| 
| Zamboanga City
| 6–3
|- bgcolor="#edbebf" 
| 10
| November 18
| Red Bull
| 89–91
| Cantrell (21)
| 
| 
| Ynares Center
| 6–4
|- bgcolor="#edbebf" 
| 11
| November 20
| Red Bull
| 92–99
| Cantrell (21)
| 
| 
| Cuneta Astrodome
| 6–5

|- bgcolor="#bbffbb" 
| 12
| December 7
| Purefoods
| 93–89 OT
| 
| 
| 
| Ynares Center
| 7–5
|- bgcolor="#edbebf" 
| 13
| December 11
| Coca Cola
| 67–73
| Taulava (13)
| 
| 
| Ynares Center
| 7–6
|- bgcolor="#bbffbb" 
| 14
| December 17
| Alaska
| 92–84
| Cantrell (26)
| 
| 
| Balanga, Bataan
| 8–6
|- bgcolor="#edbebf" 
| 15
| December 21
| Brgy.Ginebra
| 92–97
| Cantrell (21)
| 
| 
| Cuneta Astrodome
| 8–7
|- bgcolor="#bbffbb" 
| 16
| December 23
| San Miguel
| 94–73
| 
| 
| 
| Cuneta Astrodome
| 9–7

Transactions

Pre-season

Additions

Subtractions
{| cellspacing="0"
| valign="top" |

Trades

References

Talk
TNT Tropang Giga seasons